Cyc2 may refer to:
 Iron:rusticyanin reductase, an enzyme
 Terpentetriene synthase, an enzyme